The  is a river in Iwate Prefecture, in the Tōhoku region of northern Honshū in Japan. In middle course of the river is the Shizukuishi Basin, occupied by the Yuguchi lake deposits from the Late Miocene.

The Shizukuishi River rises in the Ōu Mountains just south of Mount Akita-Komagatake in the town of Shizukuishi and empties into the Kitakami River in the city of Morioka. The Gosho Dam is situated on the Shizukuishi River in western Morioka. This dam was completed in 1981. The entire length of the river is home to many renowned hot springs.

References

External links

Rivers of Iwate Prefecture
Shizukuishi, Iwate
Takizawa, Iwate
Morioka, Iwate
Rivers of Japan